The 2016 Copa Sudamericana was the 15th edition of the Copa Sudamericana, South America's secondary club football tournament organized by CONMEBOL.

The finals were originally to be played between Brazilian team Chapecoense and Colombian team Atlético Nacional. However, on 28 November 2016, LaMia Flight 2933, which was carrying the Chapecoense squad to the first leg, crashed on the way to the José María Córdova International Airport. There were 71 fatalities, including 19 of the 22 Chapecoense players on the plane. CONMEBOL immediately suspended all activities, including the scheduled final matches, in the early morning of 29 November. In light of these events, Atlético Nacional requested that CONMEBOL award the title to Chapecoense. As requested, CONMEBOL awarded Chapecoense the title of the 2016 Copa Sudamericana, their first continental title, on 5 December, while Atlético Nacional received the "CONMEBOL Centenario Fair Play" award for their gesture.

As winners of the 2016 Copa Sudamericana, Chapecoense earned the right to play against the winners of the 2016 Copa Libertadores in the 2017 Recopa Sudamericana, and the winners of the 2016 J.League Cup in the 2017 Suruga Bank Championship. They also automatically qualified for the 2017 Copa Libertadores group stage. Santa Fe were the defending champions, but were eliminated by Cerro Porteño in the Round of 16.

Teams
The following 47 teams from the 10 CONMEBOL associations qualified for the tournament:
Title holders
Brazil: 8 berths
Argentina: 6 berths
All other associations: 4 berths each

The entry stage is determined as follows:
Round of 16: Title holders
Second stage: 14 teams (teams from Argentina and Brazil)
First stage: 32 teams (teams from all other associations)

Draw

Schedule
The schedule of the competition was as follows (all dates listed are Wednesdays, but matches may be played on Tuesdays and Thursdays as well).

Notes

Elimination stages

First stage

Second stage

Final stages

Bracket

Round of 16

Quarterfinals

Semifinals

Finals

Statistics

Top goalscorers

Top assists

See also

2016 Copa Libertadores
2017 Recopa Sudamericana
2017 Suruga Bank Championship

References

External links
Copa Sudamericana 2016, CONMEBOL.com 

 
2016
2